The Brahan Seer, known in his native Scottish Gaelic as Coinneach Odhar ("Dark Kenneth"), and  Kenneth Mackenzie, was, according to legend, a predictor of the future who lived in the 17th century.

The Brahan Seer is regarded by some to be the creation of the folklorist Alexander MacKenzie (1838-1898) whose accounts occur well after some of the events the Seer is claimed to have predicted. Others have also questioned whether the Seer existed at all.

Early life
Mackenzie is thought to have come from Uig (Lewis) on lands owned by the Seaforths, and to have been of the Clan Mackenzie, although both these details are in themselves questioned. He is better known, however, for his connections to Brahan Castle near Dingwall, and the Black Isle in Easter Ross.

He is thought to have used an Adder stone, a stone with a hole in the middle, to see his visions. The Brahan Seer worked for Kenneth Mackenzie, 3rd Earl of Seaforth.

As with Nostradamus, who wrote in Provençal, most of his prophecies are best known in translation, which can in itself be deceptive. However, there are no contemporary manuscripts or accounts of his predictions, so it is impossible to verify them.

He is claimed to have prophesied, or his prophecies have been interpreted as referring to, the Battle of Culloden, the Highland Clearances, the building of the Caledonian Canal, the discovery of North Sea oil, and Margaret Thatcher.

Having become famous as a diviner and wit, he was invited to Seaforth territory in the east, to work as a labourer at Brahan Castle near Dingwall, in what is now the county of Easter Ross, where he met his downfall.

Death

This move led to an unfortunately unforeseen sequence of events on the Seer's part, leading to his barbaric murder at Chanonry Point, when he was allegedly burnt in a spiked tar barrel, on the command of the Earl's wife, Lady Seaforth. The simple prediction that led to his downfall – that the absent Earl of Seaforth was having sexual adventures with one or more women in Paris – seems likely, but of course was highly outrageous to Lady Seaforth, as it cast her husband in a scandalous light and heaped embarrassment on her.

Historical evidence
There is no historical evidence that a prophet known as "Kenneth Mackenzie" existed. For example, it is alleged that Mackenzie was born on the Isle of Lewis during the early 1600s but no historical documentation or records demonstrate this.

Historian William Matheson has argued that Alexander Mackenzie's statements about Coinneach Odhar living in the 17th century were inaccurate. There are two records for a Coinneach Odhar, a sixteenth century man who was accused of witchcraft. For example, there is a Scottish Parliament record, dated 1577, for a writ of his arrest. Such details contradict the statements of Mackenzie and those passed down through folklore.

References

Bibliography
 Hilda Roderick Ellis Davidson. (1989). The Seer in Celtic and Other Traditions. John Donald Publishers. 
 John Keay, Julia Keay. (2000). Collins Encyclopaedia of Scotland. HarperCollins.
 Alexander Mackenzie. (1899). The Prophecies of the Brahan Seer. Inverness.
 Alex Sutherland. (2009). The Brahan Seer: The Making of a Legend. Verlag Peter Lang. (thesis version online)
 Elizabeth Sutherland. (1985). Ravens & Black Rain: The Story of Highland Second Sight, Including a New Collection of the Prophecies of the Brahan Seer. Constable.
 Elizabeth Sutherland. (1996). The Seer of Kintail. Constable & Robinson.

External links
 
 Memoirs of the life of Sir Humphry Davy, (1836) Volume II, P72, by John Davy
 Memoirs of the life of Sir Walter Scott, bart., (1837) Vol III, PP 232-3, by John Gibson Lockhart
 A summer in Skye (1865) Volume 2, PP 82-3, by Alexander Smith
 'The Fate of Seaforth' in Vicissitudes of Families (1869) Vol I, P 169 by Sir Bernard Burke
 Paper read by Alexander Mackenzie before the Gaelic Society of Inverness, 18 March 1875 - Transactions of the Gaelic Society of Inverness, Volume III-IV, P196
 The Prophecies of the Brahan Seer - 1st edition - 1877
 The Prophecies of the Brahan Seer - 2nd edition - 1878
 The Prophecies of the Brahan Seer - 3rd edition - 1882
 The Prophecies of the Brahan Seer - 4th edition - 1888
 The Prophecies of the Brahan Seer, by Alexander Mackenzie (1899)
 The Brahan Seer: The Gaelic Nostradamus - BBC
 Norman Macrae, 'Highland second-sight, with prophecies of Coinneach Odhar and the Seer of Petty, and numerous other examples from the writings of Aubrey, Martin, Theophilus Insulanus, the Rev. John Fraser, dean of Argyle and the Isles, Rev. Dr. Kennedy of Dingwall, and others' (1908) Chapter XIV, P147, 'The Brahan Seer'

See also
 Thomas the Rhymer

Clan Mackenzie
Isle of Lewis
People whose existence is disputed
Prophets
Scottish folklore